Soup Live is a collaborative album by Bill Laswell, Yasuhiro Yoshigaki and Otomo Yoshihide. It was released on September 20, 2004 by P-Vine Records.

Track listing

Personnel 
Adapted from the Soup Live liner notes.
Musicians
Yuji Katsui – electric violin
Naruyoshi Kikuchi – organ, tenor saxophone
Bill Laswell – bass guitar, sampler, effects
Akira Sakata – alto saxophone
Yasuhiro Yoshigaki – drums, percussion, electronic drums, trumpet
Otomo Yoshihide – guitar, effects
Technical personnel
James Dellatacoma – assistant engineer
Michael Fossenkemper – mastering
Robert Musso – engineering
Shin Terai – producer

Release history

References

External links 
 Soup Live at Bandcamp
 

2004 live albums
Collaborative albums
Bill Laswell live albums
Otomo Yoshihide albums
Albums produced by Shin Terai
P-Vine Records live albums